East Grove Township is one of twenty-two townships in Lee County, Illinois, USA.  As of the 2010 census, its population was 256 and it contained 115 housing units.

History
East Grove was created from Hamilton Township on November 9, 1864.

Geography

Cemeteries
The township contains these three cemeteries: Saint Mary's, Stevens and Williams.

Demographics

School districts
 Amboy Community Unit School District 272

Political districts
 Illinois's 14th congressional district
 State House District 90
 State Senate District 45

References
 
 United States Census Bureau 2010 TIGER/Line Shapefiles
 United States National Atlas

External links
 City-Data.com
 Illinois State Archives
 Township Officials of Illinois

Townships in Lee County, Illinois
1864 establishments in Illinois
Townships in Illinois